Nicolas Huss (born 27 August 1964) is a French businessman, and previous chief executive officer of Ingenico Group.

Early life
He was born in Nice in the Provence-Alpes-Côte d'Azur.

He graduated from the Institut d'études politiques de Toulouse in 1987: he went to Sciences Po Toulouse, part of the University of Toulouse (Université de Toulouse), from 1984 to 1987 where he gained a LLB degree in law, later gaining a MA in Political Science and Government.

Career

In 2015 he became Chief Executive of Visa Europe, taking over from Peter Ayliffe.

In July 2017, he became VP of Strategy & Performance at Ingenico, reporting to the chairman and CEO Philippe Lazare.
In November 2018, he became CEO of Ingenico, taking over from Philippe Lazare

He joined the Board of Directors of Amadeus IT Group on 15 June 2017.

Personal life
As well as French, he speaks English and Spanish.

References

External links
 Visa Europe

1964 births
French chief executives
People from Nice
University of Toulouse alumni
Living people
Directors of Amadeus IT Group